Adam Czerkas (born 13 July 1984 in Sokołów Podlaski) is a Polish former professional footballer who played as a striker.

Club career

Loan to Queen Park Rangers
Czerkas went on loan to Queen Park Rangers from Korona Kielce in the 2006–07 season. His loan contract was terminated in December 2006.

ŁKS Łódź
In 2008, Czerkas returned to Poland to sign for ŁKS Łódź.

External links

1984 births
Living people
Polish footballers
Queens Park Rangers F.C. players
People from Sokołów County
Sportspeople from Masovian Voivodeship
Association football forwards
MKP Pogoń Siedlce players
Świt Nowy Dwór Mazowiecki players
Okęcie Warsaw players
Korona Kielce players
Odra Wodzisław Śląski players
ŁKS Łódź players
Stilon Gorzów Wielkopolski players
Legionovia Legionowo players
Polonia Warsaw players
Rozwój Katowice players
Raków Częstochowa players
Ekstraklasa players
I liga players
II liga players
III liga players
English Football League players
Polish expatriate footballers
Expatriate footballers in England
Polish expatriate sportspeople in England